Tigran Levoni Levonyan (Khandikyan, ; 1936–2004) was an Armenian operatic tenor and director, Professor of Yerevan State Conservatory. People's Artist of Armenia (1984). He was the husband of Gohar Gasparyan and brother of director Armen Khandikyan.

Biography 
Tigran Levonyan was born in Beirut and repatriated as a child to Armenia in 1946. He graduated from Yerevan Academy of Fine Arts and Russian Academy of Theatre Arts, then gained experience at the La Scala theater.

In 1962 he became the soloist of the National Theater of Opera and Ballet of Armenia performing the roles of Saro (opera "Anush" by Tigranian), Tirith ("Arshak II"  by Chuhajyan), Othello ("Othello" by Verdi), Canio (Pagliacci), Carlos (Don Carlos), Alfred (La Traviata), Shahumyan (David Bek), Manrico (Trubadur), Cavaradossi (Toska) with great depth of dramatic feeling, impressive acting and a delicate interpretation of direction.

From 1991 to 1999 he was the artistic director of Yerevan Opera Theater. In those years, the theater staged the following operas directed by Levonyan: Verdi "Othello", Tigranyan "Anush", "David Beck", Chuhajyan "Arshak II" and "Karine". He was the first to create opera films in Armenia (Almast, Arshak II, and Palmetto).

On the occasion of 1700th anniversary of Christianity in Armenia, he staged open air performances of Anush and Palmetto at Zvartnots Cathedral.

Filmography 
Karine (1968), 
Anush (1983), 
Arshak 2nd (1988, directed by Levonyan),
Almast (1986)

References

External links 
Biography
Levonyan
Тиграну Левоняну исполнилось бы 75 лет

Musicians from Beirut
20th-century Armenian male opera singers
Lebanese opera singers
People's Artists of Armenia
Komitas State Conservatory of Yerevan alumni
Operatic tenors
Lebanese people of Armenian descent
1936 births
2004 deaths